Jumbo Max (stylized in all caps) is a Japanese manga series written and illustrated by Tsutomu Takahashi. It has been serialized in Shogakukan's seinen manga magazine Big Comic since April 2020.

Publication
Written and illustrated by Tsutomu Takahashi, Jumbo Max started in Shogakukan's seinen manga magazine Big Comic on April 25, 2020. Shogakukan has collected its chapters into individual tankōbon volumes. The first volume was released on November 30, 2020. As of December 28, 2022, seven volumes have been released.

Volume list

Reception
The series was recommended by comedian and radio personality Hikaru Ijūin, with a comment featured on the obi of the second volume.

References

Further reading

External links
  

Crime in anime and manga
Seinen manga
Shogakukan manga